Natalia Fyodorovna Lopukhina (November 11 1699– March 11 1763) was a Russian noble, court official and alleged political conspirator. She was a daughter of Matryona Balk, who was sister of Anna Mons and Willem Mons. She is famous for the Lopukhina affair, an alleged conspiracy engineered by the diplomacy of Holstein and France at the Russian court and centered on the person of Lopukhina.

Life
By marriage to Stepan Vasiliyevich Lopukhin (a cousin of Eudoxia Lopukhina and a favourite of Eudoxia's husband Peter the Great) she was a member of the Lopukhin family.

During the reign of Anna of Russia (1730–40), Natalia Lopukhina was described as "the brightest flower of St Petersburg court".  Her liaisons with some of the most powerful courtiers and her arrogance toward Peter I's neglected daughter Elizaveta Petrovna must have fed the latter's jealousy.  Elizaveta's accession to the throne in 1741 was a huge blow to Lopukhina. It was owing to her friendship with Anna Bestuzheva, wife of Mikhail Bestuzhev, that she managed to maintain her position at court.

Conspiracy
In 1742, however, the French agents de la Chétardie and Lestocq arranged a complicated intrigue to slander both Lopukhina and Bestuzheva, thereby securing the downfall of the Austrophilic chancellor Aleksey Bestuzhev (Mikhail's brother). Lopukhina's affection for the exiled Count von Löwenwolde being well-known, her correspondence with this odious courtier was brought to light and presented to the Empress in the most unflattering light. Simultaneously, it was reported that her son Ivan Lopukhin, being drunk in a tavern, denounced Elizaveta's taste for English beer and mumbled several phrases which were interpreted calling for restoration of Ivan VI of Russia. The inquiry that followed established that the Lopukhin house used to be frequented by the Austrian agent Marquis Botta d'Adorno, who allegedly promised his support for restoration of Ivan VI on the Russian throne.

After a rigid inquisition of twenty-five days, during which every variety of torture was freely employed against the accused, "the terrible plot," wrote the British minister, Sir Cyril Wych, "was found to be little more than the ill-considered discourses of a couple of spiteful passionate women."

Nevertheless, Lopukhina and Bestuzheva were publicly punished on September 11, 1743. They were brought onto a scaffold in front of the Twelve Collegia in Saint Petersburg, stripped naked, and flogged with birch rods and the knout on their buttocks. Bestuzheva bribed the executioner to give her only a mock flogging. The two women escaped execution, because before her accession in 1741, Elizaveta had vowed not to sign any death warrants as Empress. Lopukhina and Bestuzheva then had their tongues publicly torn out, and were exiled to Siberia.

The Russian ambassador to Austria was instructed to demand Botta's condign punishment. This demand was presented at a special audience; whereupon Empress Maria Theresa declared that she would never admit the validity of extorted evidence, and issued a manifesto to all the Great Powers defending Botta and accusing the Russian court of rank injustice.

It is generally believed that the savage reprisal was prompted primarily by Elizaveta's personal jealousy of Lopukhina's beauty and hostility towards the Mons family, who had blocked the ascension of her mother Catherine I of Russia to the throne. Lopukhina was allowed to return to the Russian capital only after Elizaveta's death on January 5, 1762.

References

1699 births
1763 deaths
Nobility from the Russian Empire
Ladies-in-waiting from the Russian Empire
Natalia